Afreen is a mainly Middle Eastern expression originating in the Persian language used when admiring or showing amazement at something very beautiful or wonderful. It may be used both as an exclamation or interjection (meaning "well done!", "wow!" or "bravo!") and as an adjective (meaning "beautiful", "lovely", "amazing", "well-done", "awesome" or "elegant").

Name
Afreen or Afarin is also used as a female given name in the Middle East.

Etymology
The name and expression derives from  Middle Persian  āfrīn "praise, blessing" and is also the present tense form of the verb  âfaridan "to create". The expression has been translated by some as "praise to the creator!".

In popular culture 
"Afreen Afreen" is a 1996 song sung by musician and Qawwali singer Nusrat Fateh Ali Khan.

References

Feminine given names